Neofriseria kuznetzovae is a moth of the family Gelechiidae. It is found in Moldova, Ukraine and Russia (the southern Ural and southern Siberia: Altai, Tuva and Tomsk oblast).

References

Moths described in 2002
Moths of Europe
Neofriseria
Moths of Asia